"Just Can't Throw Us Away" is a song written by Peter Gorderno and Andy Jackson and recorded by Australian pop singer Hugh Sheridan. The song was released on 3 September 2009 as his debut single. The song peaked at number 73 on the ARIA Charts. Sheridan performed the song live on the finale of Dancing with the Stars on 6 September.

Track listing
Digital/CD
 "Just Can't Throw Us Away" – 3:31

Charts

Release history

References

2009 songs
2009 debut singles
Sony Music Australia singles
Hugh Sheridan songs